Nazim Jokhio murder case is a high-profile murder case in Sindh, Pakistan. Jam Abdul Karim Bijar a member of the National assembly (MNA) from NA-236 (Malir-I) allegedly torched and murdered Nazim Sajawal Jokhio, in Salar Kot, Sindh on 3 November 2021.

Bijar flew to Dubai immediately after the murder and was declared absconded by the Malir judicial magistrate on 27 January 2022. The case was transferred to Anti Terrorism Court on 7 February 2022  On 12 January 2023, court acquitted Jam Awais Bijar Khan Jokhio and others after an out-of-court settlement.

Background 
Before the murder, Nazim Jokhio filmed Pakistan Peoples Party's MNA Jam Abdul Karim Bijar and foreigners hunting 
Houbara bustard, an endangered species of migratory bird in Pakistan, in the Thatta district, Sindh. Jokhio was threatened to remove the video or to face the consequences. According to Jokhio's brother, he refused to delete the video. Jokhio filmed a video before the night of murder revealing that he shot video of illegal hunting and he is getting death threats from Pakistan Peoples Party MNA.

Nazim Jokhio was killed after being tortured by stick, punches, and beating in the farmhouse near Malir Jam Goth of influential MNA. Autopsy revealed several torture marks and reflected that he sustained trauma before death; including on his genital area.

Police did not act on the incident due to the influential nature of MNA, before there was uproar on social media on 5 November 2021. The suspected murderer Jam Abdul Karim Bijar along with his brother was able to escape the country and reach Dubai before the police could reach them.

Investigation and trail 
A case was booked on Anti Terrorism Court of Pakistan against MNA Jam Abdul Karim Bijar, Pakistan Peoples Party Member of provisional assembly Jam Awais and the other five suspects. The MNA came back to Pakistan to participate in no-confidence motion against Imran Khan, however, he arranged prior protective bail.

In the turn of events Jokhio's widow pardoned Jam Abdul Karim Bijar,
 however, before this Jokhio's brother Afzal Jokhio also with drew case against influential Pakistan Peoples Party's MNA under pressure.

Other nominees in Nazim Jokhio's case including the brother of Jam Abdul Karim, and member of Sindh Assembly Jam Awais, and his guards acquitted by count after an out-of-court settlement on 12 January 2023.

References 

2021 in Sindh
2021 murders in Pakistan
2020s crimes in Sindh
November 2021 crimes in Asia
Deaths by person in Pakistan
Murder in Sindh
Torture in Pakistan